Warren Ambrose Dibble (21 February 1931 – 27 July 2014) was a New Zealand poet and playwright.

Early life and family
Dibble was born in Palmerston North on 21 February 1931, the son of Victor Thomas Dibble and Alma Dibble (née Edgecombe). His father was secretary of the Manawatu Racing Club, and committed suicide by gunshot in December 1932, having suffered from depression and what would now be understood as post-traumatic stress disorder following his service in World War I.

Writing career
Dibble was awarded the Robert Burns Fellowship from the University of Otago in 1969. Ralph Hotere, who was the Frances Hodgkins Fellow at Otago also in 1969, incorporated some of Dibble's poems into his artwork.  Dibble wrote plays for television, theatre and radio, including Killing of Kane, based on the deeds of Titokowaru in Taranaki in the 1860s, the anti-Vietnam war theatrical cartoon Operation Pigstick, the one-off tele-drama Double Exposure, Lord, Dismiss Us… and Lines to M.

Dibble moved to Sydney in the 1970s and died there in 2014.

References

1931 births
2014 deaths
20th-century New Zealand poets
20th-century New Zealand male writers
New Zealand male poets
20th-century New Zealand dramatists and playwrights
New Zealand male dramatists and playwrights
People from Palmerston North
New Zealand emigrants to Australia